WMON (1340 AM) is a sports-formatted broadcast radio station licensed to Montgomery, West Virginia, United States, serving eastern Kanawha County, West Virginia and western Fayette County, West Virginia. WMON is owned and operated by L.M. Communications, Inc.

Previous logo

External links

MON
Sports radio stations in the United States
Radio stations established in 1946
1946 establishments in West Virginia